Sympistis sandaraca is a moth of the family Noctuidae first described by John S. Buckett and William R. Bauer in 1967. 

The wingspan is 32–34 mm. Adults are on wing in late summer and fall.

References

S
Moths of North America
Fauna of California
Moths described in 1967